Lyonel Thomas Senter Jr. (July 30, 1933 – May 18, 2011) was a United States district judge of the United States District Court for the Northern District of Mississippi.

Education and career

Born in Fulton, Mississippi, Senter received a Bachelor of Science degree from the University of Southern Mississippi in 1956 and a Bachelor of Laws from the University of Mississippi School of Law in 1959. He was in private practice in Aberdeen, Mississippi, between 1959 and 1968, also serving as Monroe County prosecuting attorney from 1960 to 1963. He was a United States Commissioner for the United States District Court for the Northern District of Mississippi from 1966 to 1968. He was a circuit judge for the state of Mississippi, on the First Judicial District of Mississippi, from 1968 to 1979.

Federal judicial service

On October 11, 1979, Senter was nominated by President Jimmy Carter to a seat on the United States District Court for the Northern District of Mississippi vacated by Judge Orma Rinehart Smith. Senter was confirmed by the United States Senate on December 20, 1979 in a 43-25 vote, and received his commission on December 21, 1979. He served as Chief Judge from 1982 to 1998. He assumed senior status on July 30, 1998 and took inactive senior status on April 8, 2011. He attended the National Judicial College at the University of Nevada, Reno.

Death

Senter died at North Mississippi Medical Center in Tupelo, Mississippi, on May 18, 2011.

References

Sources
 

1933 births
2011 deaths
Judges of the United States District Court for the Northern District of Mississippi
United States district court judges appointed by Jimmy Carter
20th-century American judges
University of Mississippi School of Law alumni
People from Fulton, Mississippi